The 28th District of the Iowa Senate is located in northeastern Iowa, and is currently composed of Allamakee, Clayton, Fayette, and Winneshiek Counties.

Current elected officials
Mike Klimesh is the senator currently representing the 28th District.

The area of the 28th District contains two Iowa House of Representatives districts:
The 55th District (represented by Michael Bergan)
The 56th District (represented by Anne Osmundson)

The district is also located in Iowa's 1st congressional district, which is represented by U.S. Representative Ashley Hinson.

Past senators
The district has previously been represented by:

Jeremiah Jenkins, 1856–1859
D. Hammer, 1860–1863
Josiah Hatch, 1864–1865
Jonathan Cattell, 1866–1869
Frank Campbell, 1870–1873
Thomas Mitchell, 1874–1877
John Nichols, 1878–1883
Preston Sutton, 1884–1887
William Mills, 1888–1891
George Turner, 1892–1895
J.L. Carney, 1896–1899
J.B. Classen, 1900–1903
Charles Eckles, 1904–1908
Comfort Harvey Van Law, 1909–1912
Wallace Arney, 1913–1918
Ray Scott, 1919–1922
William McLeland, 1923–1932
Chris Reese, 1933–1936
B.C. Whitehill, 1937–1946
Robert Rockhill, 1947–1948
W. Eldon Walter, 1949–1956
Howard Buck, 1957–1964
Warren Kruck, 1965–1968
R. Dean Arbuckle, 1969–1972
Karl Nolin, 1973–1976
Bill Hutchins, 1977–1982
Richard Drake, 1983–1992
Andy McKean, 1993–2002
James Seymour, 2003–2012
Michael Breitbach, 2013–2021
Mike Klimesh, 2021–present

Note: the boundaries of districts have changed over history. Previous politicians of a specific numbered district have represented a completely different geographic area, due to redistricting.

See also
Iowa General Assembly
Iowa Senate

References

28